The correlative rights doctrine is a legal doctrine limiting the rights of landowners to a common source of groundwater (such as an aquifer) to a reasonable share, typically based on the amount of land owned by each on the surface above.  This doctrine is also applied to oil and gas in some U.S. states.

See also
Mineral rights
Water rights
United States groundwater law

References
Black's Law Dictionary
BarBri Real Property outline

 
Water law
Oil and gas law
Legal doctrines and principles